"Stoned Love" is a 1970 hit single recorded by The Supremes for the Motown label. It was the last Billboard Pop Top Ten hit for the group, peaking at number seven, and their last Billboard number-one R&B hit as well, although the trio continued to score top ten hits in the UK into 1972. In the UK, it was the post-Ross Supremes' biggest hit, reaching number 3 in the singles chart. The single spent six weeks in the UK top ten and five weeks in the US top ten. The BBC ranked "Stoned Love" at number 99 on The Top 100 Digital Motown Chart, which ranks Motown releases solely on their all time UK downloads and streams.

History

Song information
A plea for love and peace similar to those recorded by Sly & the Family Stone in the late 1960s, the lyrics of "Stoned Love" were a plea for the people of the world to end conflict and animosity between each other, specifically the Vietnam War.  Writer Kenny Thomas chose the term "stone love" to define the concept of an unchanging bond between one another.  The same phrase appeared more than sixteen years later in Kool & the Gang's title "Stone Love" and in a slight variant two years later in The Stylistics' title "I'm Stone in Love with You".

Thomas was a Detroit teenager who had entered some of his songs into a local radio talent show, which record producer Frank Wilson happened to tune into. Wilson arranged a meeting with the young musician at Thomas' house, where he proceeded to play a number of songs on a guitar that only had two strings.  One of the songs he played was an unfinished version of "Stoned Love." Wilson was very much impressed with the song and came back to Thomas' house a few days later with, to Thomas' delight and surprise, Supremes member Mary Wilson (no relation to Frank).

After a few lines of the song were revised by the producer, "Stoned Love" was recorded during the spring of 1970. The instrumental track was recorded with The Funk Brothers and at least 30 other session musicians in Detroit at Motown Studio B (the former Golden World studio), while Jean Terrell, Mary Wilson, and Cindy Birdsong recorded their vocals in New York. The song was originally written and recorded as "Stone Love", but during the process of mixing and releasing, it was mislabeled as "Stoned Love".

Release and controversy
Many people saw the song as a coded reference to drug use, and many radio station owners were at first apprehensive to play the record. Motown founder Berry Gordy was also said to have hated the song, and label executive Barney Ales had to arrange for the RKO radio stations to agree to play "Stoned Love" before releasing the single. Fearing that the song was indeed a reference to drug use, CBS cut a live performance of the song from a November 1970 episode of The Merv Griffin Show.

The Supremes' album New Ways but Love Stays, released in October 1970, spawned only "Stoned Love" as a single. The song also appears in the 1994 film Forrest Gump starring Tom Hanks. In 2004 neo soul singer Angie Stone covered the tune as the intro to her Stone Love album.

In other media
Manchester band The Stone Roses used the song as their intro track before taking to the stage for each night of their hugely successful 2012 reunion tour.

Notes
1 Kenny Thomas' writing credit on "Stoned Love" is listed as "Yennek Samoht"; his name spelled backwards (with an extra "e" to aid pronunciation). He did this both to emulate Stevie Wonder (who recorded an instrumental album under the name "Eivets Rednow") and because he thought "Samoht" was close to the last name of his idol Nina Simone.

Personnel
 Lead vocals by Jean Terrell
 Background vocals by Jean Terrell, Mary Wilson and Cindy Birdsong
 Instrumentation by the Funk Brothers
 Arranged by David Van De Pitte

Chart performance

Weekly charts

Year-end charts

Certifications

References

External links
 

1970 songs
1970 singles
The Supremes songs
Motown singles
Protest songs
Songs written by Frank Wilson (musician)
Psychedelic soul songs
Song recordings produced by Frank Wilson (musician)
Songs against racism and xenophobia